Krit Amnuaydechkorn (also known as PP, born 30 April 1999), is a Thai actor, model and singer. He is known for his roles as Tewkao in My Ambulance (2019) and as Oh-aew in I Told Sunset About You (2020) and I Promised You the Moon (2021).

Early life and education 
Krit was born in Bangkok, Thailand on April 30, 1999. At first, he was named Pruk , but only 2–3 weeks later, his parents felt that it was outdated, and decided to change it to PP. He studied at Assumption College from primary to secondary. In Grade 11, he got an opportunity to spend a year in the states as an exchange student. Krit received his high school diploma in 2017. In 2022, he graduated with a degree in entrepreneurial economics at the Faculty of Economics at Kasetsart University.

Career 
Krit's career in the entertainment industry began when he was scouted by Gong Hive Salon, a famous hair stylist, during his 12th Grade. He got his first opportunity to be a main cast in "MSN" music video, which is a famous single from Helmetheads band. In the same year, he was also cast as a catwalk model in "Boys of Bangkok 2017" at the Emquartier. In 2018, he had his first opportunity to work in the acting field in i Stories (2018) "G" Episode", which is a project of four LGBT-themed short stories. 

He rose to popularity with his role as Tewkao in My Ambulance (2019) where he was paired with Putthipong Assaratanakul (Billkin), who played the role of Doctor Tao. With the conclusion of the said television series in October 2019, plans were made to produce a boys' love television series where Putthipong and Krit will play as lead actors. The project, with a working title of "BKPP: The Series", was announced in February 2020 and was supposed to premiere in July 2020. Due to government restrictions placed amidst the COVID-19 pandemic, the series' production was delayed with its release pushed to October 2020 under the title of I Told Sunset About You. Krit played the role of Oh-aew, a high-school student from Phuket and a childhood friend and eventually lover of Putthipong's character Teh. The series returned for a second season in May 2021 entitled I Promised You the Moon.

Krit officially debuted as a singer under Nadao Bangkok's music label Nadao Music, with the release of his debut single "It's Okay Not To Be Alright" in August 2021. He later released another single "I'll Do It How You Like It" in February 2022.

Filmography

Television series

Discography

Awards and nomination

References

External links 

Krit Amnuaydechkorn
Krit Amnuaydechkorn
Krit Amnuaydechkorn
Krit Amnuaydechkorn
1999 births
Living people